BASIC Computer Games is a compilation of type-in computer games in the BASIC programming language collected by David H. Ahl. Some of the games were written or modified by Ahl as well. Among its better-known games are Hamurabi and Super Star Trek.

Originally published in 1973 as 101 BASIC Computer Games, the book was so popular that it had two more printing runs, the last in March 1975. The programs in these books were written in the BASIC dialect found on Digital's minicomputers.

In 1974, Ahl left DEC. He purchased the rights to the book and republished it under the new name. With the release of the first microcomputers, and Microsoft BASIC soon after, the games were ported to this dialect. By the early 1980s, with tens of millions of home computers in the market, it had become the first computer book to sell a million copies.

History 
Around 1971, Ahl ported two popular early mainframe games from DEC's FOCAL language to BASIC: Hamurabi and Lunar Lander. He published the BASIC versions in DEC's educational newsletter, EDU, which he edited. Their popularity was such that he called for more submissions for future editions of the newsletter, and quickly gathered many, with a considerable group of them coming from high school students. The wide availability of BASIC on various platforms, notably the Data General Nova and HP 2100 series, led to considerable porting effort to and from the DEC platform.

In 1974, Ahl left DEC to start Creative Computing magazine. He re-acquired the rights to the book from DEC and re-published under the name BASIC Computer Games. It was around this time that the first hobbyist microcomputers started appearing in 1975, and it became quite popular with these owners. The release of the "1977 Trinity" machines (Apple II, Commodore PET, and TRS-80) was soon followed by a great many new competing microcomputer platforms featuring BASIC, along with the userbase to go with them, and demand for the book led to a second edition in 1978. Sales remained strong for years, and spawned similar collections in More Basic Computer Games (1979), and Big Computer Games (1984) and Basic Computer Adventures (1984), with translations into six languages.

Games
Chomp
Civil War
Hexapawn
Hamurabi (based on The Sumer Game by Doug Dyment)
Nim
Super Star Trek

Reception
The first version, 101 went into a second printing and eventually sold 10,000 copies. Ahl later noted that “was far more books than there were computers around, so people were buying three, four, five of them for each computer.”

The second version, BASIC, was re-printed many times and was the first computer book to sell a million copies. Harry McCracken called it "The single most influential book of the BASIC era".

Legacy 
Using Vintage Basic, the games can be run on any Microsoft Windows (32-bit or 64-bit), macOS (64-bit only), or Linux (64-bit only) system. The source code for the book is provided (with permission of David H Ahl) on Vintage Basic's Basic Computer Games page.

A Microsoft Windows machine with the GW-BASIC interpreter (32-bit only) can also run the games.

The games are also compilable and playable with the Microsoft Small Basic development environment for children. Computer Science for Kids has released a 2010 Small Basic Edition of the classic Basic Computer Games book called Basic Computer Games: Small Basic Edition.

A project started on GitHub in 2021 to port the games in these books to modern languages.

Program listings from the second ("microcomputer") edition, and from More Basic Computer Games, can be run by the open-source Brassica interpreter in R or Python.

References

External links

Basic Computer Games: Small Basic 2010 Edition
George Beker's BEKERBOTS Site.  Beker illustrated the Basic Computer Games books
Basic Computer Games archived on AtariArchives.org
GW-BASIC games and other programs, including selections from the Basic Computer Games series

BASIC programming language family
Source code
Books about video games
Open-source video games
Public-domain software with source code
Software using the Unlicense license